Jeff Chang is an American historian, journalist, and music critic on hip hop music and culture. His 2005 book, Can't Stop Won't Stop, which won the Before Columbus Foundation's American Book Award, chronicles the early hip hop scene. His writing has appeared in URB, BOMB, San Francisco Chronicle, The Village Voice, San Francisco Bay Guardian, Vibe, Spin, The Nation, and Mother Jones. He has also been featured on NPR.

Chang was the executive director of the Institute for Diversity in the Arts + Committee on Black Performing Arts at Stanford University. He also served as the executive director of the Institute for Diversity in the Arts at Stanford. In June 2018, the Institute announced that Chang would leave to become the first vice president of Narrative, Arts, and Culture at Race Forward. Chang resides in the San Francisco Bay Area.

Early life and education
Born of Chinese and Native Hawaiian ancestry, Chang was born and raised in Hawaiʻi where he attended ʻIolani School. He then earned his bachelor's degree at University of California, Berkeley, and went on to get his master's degree in Asian American Studies from University of California, Los Angeles.

Career 
In 1993, Chang co-founded and ran the indie hip hop label SoleSides, which is now known as Quannum Projects. He helped launch the careers of DJ Shadow, Blackalicious, Lyrics Born, and Lateef the Truthspeaker.

As a student, Chang was influenced by the anti-apartheid and the anti-racist movements at University of California, Berkeley, where he worked as a community laborer and student organizer. He also worked as a lobbyist for the students of the California State University. Chang has lectured at colleges, universities, festivals, and institutions in the U.S. and around the world. Chang was an organizer of the inaugural National Hip-Hop Political Convention.

Chang is a United States Artists Fellow in Literature, and has won awards such as the North Star News Prize award, the UTNE Reader award, the St. Clair Drake Teaching Award at Stanford University in 2014 and the 50 Visionaries Changing Your Word award. He cofounded CultureStrike and ColorLines movements. In 2005 he participated in a conversation with Tom Hayden, the social and political activist and director of the Peace and Justice Resource Center in Culver City, California, in the Mario Savio Memorial Lecture. 

In 2007, Chang interviewed then-candidate Barack Obama, for the cover of Vibe magazine. He has also written for The Nation, The New York Times, the San Francisco Chronicle, The Believer, Foreign Policy, n+1, Mother Jones, Salon, Slate, and BuzzFeed, among others.

In 2005, Picador published his first book, Can’t Stop Won’t Stop, which won the American Book Award and the Asian American Literary Award. In 2007, he edited the book Total Chaos: The Art and Aesthetics of Hip-Hop, a compilation of different artists' interviews and discussions.

Chang's other books include:
 Who We Be: A Cultural History of Race in Post-Civil Rights America (2014, St. Martin's Press)
 We Gon' Be Alright: Notes on Race and Resegregation (2016, Picador)

References

External links

American music critics
American music journalists
American male journalists
American writers of Taiwanese descent
American writers of Chinese descent
Writers from Hawaii
Native Hawaiian writers
University of California, Davis alumni
ʻIolani School alumni
Living people
San Francisco Chronicle people
The Nation (U.S. magazine) people
Year of birth missing (living people)
Place of birth missing (living people)
American journalists of Chinese descent
Hawaii people of Chinese descent
American Book Award winners
American hip hop record producers
Progressivism in the United States